Patrick Sims (born November 29, 1985) is a former American football defensive tackle. He was drafted by the Cincinnati Bengals in the third round of the 2008 NFL Draft and has also played for the Oakland Raiders. He played college football at Auburn University.

Early years
Sims played high school football at Dillard High School in Fort Lauderdale before attending Auburn University to play college football. He was picked with the 77th pick in the 3rd round in the 2008 NFL draft by the Cincinnati Bengals.

Professional career

Cincinnati Bengals
Sims was drafted by the Bengals in the third round, 77th overall, in the 2008 NFL Draft. He played with the Bengals from 2008 to 2012 after re-signing on March 24, 2012.

Oakland Raiders
Sims signed with the Oakland Raiders on March 13, 2013. He re-signed with the Raiders on March 28, 2014.

Cincinnati Bengals (second stint)
Sims signed with the Bengals on March 26, 2015. Sims has been praised for his strong play on the interior against the run.

On March 16, 2016, Sims re-signed with the Bengals on a two-year contract.

On November 18, 2017, Sims was released by the Bengals, but was re-signed three days later.

References

External links
Oakland Raiders bio
Cincinnati Bengals bio
Auburn Tigers bio

1985 births
Living people
Players of American football from Fort Lauderdale, Florida
American football defensive tackles
Auburn Tigers football players
Cincinnati Bengals players
Oakland Raiders players